Frank Hall (July 8, 1865 – July 31, 1939) was an American sport shooter who competed in the 1912 Summer Olympics. He was a member of the New York Athletic Club.

In 1912 he won the gold medal as member of the American team in the team clay pigeons competition. In the individual trap event he finished twelfth.

He was born in Jersey City, New Jersey and died in New York City.

References

1865 births
1939 deaths
American male sport shooters
Olympic gold medalists for the United States in shooting
Sportspeople from Jersey City, New Jersey
Shooters at the 1912 Summer Olympics
Trap and double trap shooters
Olympic medalists in shooting
Medalists at the 1912 Summer Olympics
19th-century American people
20th-century American people